An earthquake light is a luminous aerial phenomenon that appears in the sky at or near areas of tectonic stress, seismic activity, or volcanic eruptions. There is no broad consensus as to the causes of the phenomenon (or phenomena) involved. The phenomenon differs from disruptions to electrical grids – such as arcing power lines – which can produce bright flashes as a result of ground shaking or hazardous weather conditions.

Appearance
One of the first records of earthquake lights is from the 869 Sanriku earthquake, described as "strange lights in the sky" in Nihon Sandai Jitsuroku. The lights are reported to appear while an earthquake is occurring, although there are reports of lights before or after earthquakes, such as reports concerning the 1975 Kalapana earthquake. They are reported to have shapes similar to those of the auroras, with a white to bluish hue, but occasionally they have been reported having a wider color spectrum. The luminosity is reported to be visible for several seconds, but has also been reported to last for tens of minutes.

During the 2003 Colima earthquake in Mexico, colorful lights were seen in the skies for the duration of the earthquake. During the 2007 Peru earthquake lights were seen in the skies above the sea and filmed by many people. The phenomenon was also observed and caught on film during the 2009 L'Aquila and the 2010 Chile earthquakes. The phenomenon was also reported around the North Canterbury earthquake in New Zealand, that occurred 1 September 1888. The lights were visible in the morning of 1 September in Reefton, and again on 8 September.

More recent appearances of the phenomenon, along with video footage of the incidents, happened in Sonoma County, California on August 24, 2014, and in Wellington, New Zealand on November 14, 2016, where blue flashes like lightning were seen in the night sky, and recorded on several videos.

Appearances of the earthquake light seem to occur when the quakes have a high magnitude, generally 5 or higher on the Richter scale.
There have also been incidents of yellow, ball-shaped lights appearing before earthquakes.

Instances of this phenomenon appear in videos taken seconds after a 7.1 magnitude earthquake in the city of Acapulco, Mexico, around 20:47 on 7 September 2021. The New York Times reported that "Videos from both Acapulco and Mexico City also showed the night sky lit up with electrical flashes as power lines swayed and buckled."

A recent one was seen in Qinghai Province, China at 01:45 on 8 January 2022. Surveillance video of a local resident captured the moment.  During the 2022 Fukushima earthquake the phenomena was captured on video from multiple angles.

This phenomenon was observed around 1:18 on 22 September 2022. Social media users including Webcams de México posted videos of blue lights which seemed to be radiating upward. This was reported in Mexico News Daily and included one of the videos.

During the 2023 Turkey–Syria earthquake, earthquake lights were seen in  Kahramanmaraş, Turkey with an earthquake magnitude of 7.8. Multiple lights appeared continuously.
Video link: https://dai.ly/x8hye04 (video taken at Gaziantep, 77km away from the source) and in the Hatay region.

Types 

Earthquake lights may be classified into two different groups based on their time of appearance: (1) preseismic earthquake light, which generally occur a few seconds to up to a few weeks prior to an earthquake, and are generally observed closer to the epicenter and (2) coseismic earthquake light, which can occur either near the epicenter ("earthquake‐induced stress"), or at significant distances away from the epicenter during the passage of the seismic wavetrain, in particular during the passage of S waves ("wave‐induced stress").

Earthquake light during the lower magnitude aftershock series seem to be rare.

Possible explanations 
Research into earthquake lights is ongoing; as such, several mechanisms have been proposed.

Some models suggest the generation of earthquake lights involve the ionization of oxygen to oxygen anions by breaking of peroxy bonds in some types of rocks (dolomite, rhyolite, etc.) by the high stress before and during an earthquake. After the ionisation, the ions travel up through the cracks in the rocks. Once they reach the atmosphere these ions can ionise pockets of air, forming plasma that emits light. Lab experiments have validated that some rocks do ionise the oxygen in them when subjected to high stress levels.
Research suggests that the angle of the fault is related to the likelihood of earthquake light generation, with subvertical (nearly vertical) faults in rifting environments having the most incidences of earthquake lights.

One hypothesis involves intense electric fields created piezoelectrically by tectonic movements of quartz-containing rocks such as granite.

Another possible explanation is local disruption of the Earth's magnetic field and/or ionosphere in the region of tectonic stress, resulting in the observed glow effects either from ionospheric radiative recombination at lower altitudes and greater atmospheric pressure or as aurora. However, the effect is clearly not pronounced or notably observed at all earthquake events and is yet to be directly experimentally verified.

During the American Physical Society's 2014 March meeting, research was provided that gave a possible explanation for the reason why bright lights sometimes appear during an earthquake.  The research stated that when two layers of the same material rub against each other, voltage is generated. The researcher, Troy Shinbrot of Rutgers University, conducted experiments with different types of grains to mimic the crust of the Earth and emulated the occurrence of earthquakes. He reported that "when the grains split open, they measured a positive voltage spike, and when the split closed, a negative spike." The crack allows the voltage to discharge into the air which then electrifies the air and creates a bright electrical light when it does so.  According to Shinbrot, they have produced these voltage spikes every single time with every material tested.  While the reason for such an occurrence was not provided, Shinbrot referenced the phenomenon of triboluminescence. Researchers hope that by getting to the bottom of this phenomenon, it will provide more information that will allow seismologists to better predict earthquakes.

Criticism
In 2016, science podcaster Brian Dunning said he was skeptical that the phenomenon even existed, citing a lack of direct evidence at the time. There is also a "staggering volume of literature... hardly any of these papers agree on anything... I'm forced to wonder how many of these eager researchers are familiar with Hyman's Categorical Imperative: 'Do not try to explain something until you are sure there is something to be explained'."

In 2016, freelance writer Robert Sheaffer wrote that skeptics and science bloggers should be more skeptical of the phenomenon. Sheaffer on his Bad UFO blog shows examples of what people claim are earthquake lights, then he shows photos of iridescent clouds which appear to be the same. He states that "It's truly remarkable how mutable "earthquake lights" are. Sometimes they look like small globes, climbing up a mountain. Sometimes they look like flashes of lightning. Other times they look exactly like iridescent clouds. Earthquake lights can look like anything at all, when you are avidly seeking evidence for them."

The phenomenon has been captured in video multiple times since 2016.

See also
 Ball lightning
 Earthquake cloud
 Earthquake prediction
 Earthquake weather

References

External links

 

Atmospheric ghost lights
Earthquake and seismic risk mitigation
Light sources